Wynfrith is an Old English/Anglo-Saxon name.

People with the name
Saint Boniface, an English missionary who preached Christianity in the Frankish Empire during the 8th century; patron saint of Germany.
Winfrith (bishop), a bishop of Lichfield.